Richard Thomas Mullaly (19 June 1892 – 11 June 1971) was an Australian rules footballer who played with South Melbourne in the Victorian Football League (VFL).

Family
The son of William Patrick Mullaly (-1936), and Emma Mullaly, née Dillon, he was born on 19 June 1892. He married Gertrude Sarah Black (1893-1919) in 1916. They had a daughter, Catherine Marie (1918-).

He married, for a second time, on 28  November 1925. His second wife was Anne Elizabeth Finn (1900-1990). Their son, Paul Richard Mullaly, Q.C., B.A., LL.B,. Dip.Theol., was a judge of the Victorian County Court from 1979 to 2001.

Football
Recruited locally from Leopold, Mullaly played mainly as a centreman during his time at South Melbourne. He participated in South Melbourne's 1912 and 1914 VFL Grand Final losses.

Mullaly continued to serve South Melbourne after his retirement in the role of Club Secretary, a position he held for 12 years — with the collection of players recruited from interstate in 1932/1933 becoming known as South Melbourne's "Foreign Legion". He was awarded life membership in 1940.

He was also a selector for the Victorian interstate team and helped pick the side which competed in the 1933 Sydney Carnival.

Death
Dick Mullaly died on 11 June 1971.

Notes

References
 Writ for Slander: Against Football Club Secretary, The Age, (Thursday 11 April 1935), p.12.
 Night Football: To The Editor of the Sporting Globe (letter from R. T. Mullaly), The Sporting Globe, (Saturday, 20 April 1935), p.7.

External links
 
 

1892 births
Australian rules footballers from Melbourne
Sydney Swans players
Leopold Football Club (MJFA) players
1971 deaths
People from Port Melbourne